Markus Carl Olof Karlsson (born 20 January 2004) is a Swedish professional footballer who plays as a right back or centre-back for Hammarby IF in Allsvenskan.

Early life
Born and raised in Stockholm, Karlsson started to play youth football with local club Hammarby IF in 2009, at age five. In 2021, Karlsson was part of the side that finished second in P19 Allsvenskan, after a 2–1 loss to IFK Göteborg in the national final. The team also competed in the 2021–22 UEFA Youth League, getting knocked out by Rangers in the first round through 1–5 on aggregate.

Club career

Hammarby IF
On 22 December 2021, Karlsson signed a three-year deal with Hammarby, running until the end of 2024, his first professional contact. In 2022, he mostly played for Hammarby TFF in Ettan, Sweden's third tier, making 19 league appearances.

On 25 February 2023, Karlsson made his competitive debut for Hammarby, coming on as a substitute in a 3–0 away win against Norrby IF in Svenska Cupen.

International career
Between 2019 and 2022, Karlsson was called up to the Swedish under-17's and  Swedish under-19's

Career statistics

Club

Notes

References

External links
 
 

2004 births
Living people
Footballers from Stockholm
Swedish footballers
Sweden youth international footballers
Association football defenders
Ettan Fotboll players
Hammarby Fotboll players
Hammarby Talang FF players